The huge moth family Noctuidae contains the following genera:

A B C D E F G H I J K L M N O P Q R S T U V W X Y Z

Iambia
Iambiodes
Ianius
Ichneutica
Ichthyopselapha
Idalima
Idia
Idicara
Ikondiana
Ilarus
Ilattia
Ilsea
Iluza
Ilyrgis
Ilyrgodes
Imitator
Imleanga
Immetalia
Imosca
Inabaia
Incita
Indocala
Ingura
Inguridia
Insolentipalpus
Interdelta
Internoctua
Iodopepla
Iontha
Ipanephis
Ipanica
Ipermarca
Ipimorpha
Ipiristis
Ipnea
Ipnista
Iranada
Isadelphina
Isana
Isatoolna
Ischyja
Isochlora
Isogona
Isolasia
Isopolia
Isoura
Istarba
Itmaharela
Itomia

References 

 Natural History Museum Lepidoptera genus database

 
Noctuid genera I